Magna-Tiles are a construction toy system. The pieces are plastic tiles of varying shapes that snap together magnetically, allowing users to build various geometric structures.

Magna-Tiles were originally developed in Japan, where they were sold under the name Pythagoras. American salesman Rudy Valenta saw the toy while visiting Japan in 1996 and bought the rights to the toy. He re-branded the toy system "Magna-Tiles" and founded Valtech Co. in 1997 to sell it.

Sales began slowly, but Magna-Tiles are now "ubiquitous" among young children in the United States. The New York Times and other publications have highlighted Magna-Tiles as a top toy.

Similar products include Magformers, Playmags, and Picasso Tiles.

References

Construction toys